Gretna is a genus of skipper butterflies in the family Hesperiidae. It is the only genus in the monotypic tribe Gretnini.

Species
Gretna balenge (Holland, 1891)
Gretna bugoma Evans, 1947
Gretna carmen Evans, 1937
Gretna cylinda (Hewitson, 1876)
Gretna lacida (Hewitson, 1876)
Gretna leakeyi Collins & Larsen, 1995
Gretna waga (Plötz, 1886)
Gretna zaremba (Plötz, 1884)

References

Seitz, A. Die Gross-Schmetterlinge der Erde 13: Die Afrikanischen Tagfalter. Plate XIII 80

External links

Natural History Museum Lepidoptera genus database

Hesperiidae genera